Raffaele Quattrucci (Arce, Province of Frosinone) was an Italian painter, depicting genre subjects and portraits. He also began to paint in the 1880s Neo-Pompeian and Orientalist subjects.

Biography
He was a resident of Roma. Quattrucci exhibited In 1881 at Milan, he exhibited a Costume di fanciulla romana and  Studio di vecchio, and at Rome in 1883: Al bagno and Prima del bagno.

References

19th-century Italian painters
Italian male painters
Orientalist painters
Neo-Pompeian painters
People from the Province of Frosinone
19th-century Italian male artists